Winding Roads may refer to:

 Winding Roads (film), the 1999 directorial debut of Theodore Melfi
 "Winding Roads", a song by The Sound of Arrows from the 2008 release Danger! (EP)